The Koma language, Konni, is a Gur language of Ghana. Yikpabongo is the main village of the Konni people. Another village is Nangurima.

Koma has vowel harmony. The nine vowel phonemes of Konni are grouped into two sets according to the ATR feature:
 +ATR  
 −ATR 

Koma is related to Mampruli, Hanga and Buli.

References

Oti–Volta languages
Languages of Ghana